Congo participated in the 2010 Summer Youth Olympics in Singapore.

The Congo team consisted of 4 athletes competing in 4 sports: athletics, table tennis, taekwondo and wrestling.

Athletics

Girls
Track and Road Events

Table tennis

Individual

Team

Taekwondo

Wrestling

Freestyle

References

External links
Competitors List: Congo

Nations at the 2010 Summer Youth Olympics
2010 in the Republic of the Congo sport
Republic of the Congo at the Youth Olympics